HMBS Leonard C Banfield (P 02) is patrol vessel of the Barbados Coast Guard.
She was commissioned on 14 September 2007. She is built to the design of the Damen Group's Stan 4207 patrol vessel, a class of  240 ton vessels.

According to Aviation Week the vessel and her sister ships primary armament was a non-lethal water cannon, but she was also armed with machine guns. She is built to withstand sea state 8 conditions. She was built in the Netherlands at Damen′s Gorinchem Shipyards.

She and her sister ships are equipped with a stern launching ramp, like some other cutters built to Damen designs. The stern launching ramp allows a water-jet–powered pursuit boat to be launched and retrieved without bringing the cutter to a halt.

Aviation Week reports that the local Barbadian Press reported the vessels cost $6 million each.
The HMBS Leonard C. Banfield is the first in a class that also includes the HMBS Rudyard Lewis, commissioned on the 13 of September 2008, and the HMBS Trident, commissioned on the 25 of April 2009.

References

Government of Barbados
Ships of the Barbados Coast Guard
2007 ships